Ronald Bruce Stanton  (born December 20, 1957) is a Canadian politician who served as Member of Parliament for the riding of Simcoe North from 2006 to 2021. Stanton first ran as a member of the Conservative Party in the 2006 federal election and won with 40.44% of the vote. He was re-elected in 2008, obtaining 49.7% of the vote. He won again in 2011 with 54.44% of the vote. He was re-elected again in the 2015 federal election.. He was named the 49th Deputy Speaker of the House of Commons on December 4, 2015, serving in this position in the 42nd Canadian Parliament and 43rd Canadian Parliament. When the speaker is absent from the House of Commons, the Deputy Speaker is vested with the powers of the Speaker.

Born in Orillia, Ontario, Canada, Stanton ran a family tourism business on Sparrow Lake that had been founded in 1884. He served as a board member of Resorts Ontario, Tourism Ontario, the Board of the Tourism Association of Canada, and the Huronia Tourist Association. For four years, he was a member of the Severn Township municipal council.

On June 25, 2020, Stanton announced that he would not seek re-election for a sixth term as Simcoe North's Member of Parliament in the 2021 Canadian federal election. He was succeeded by Adam Chambers of the Conservative Party.

Electoral history

References

External links
 
2006 election results from the CBC
Bruce Stanton's biography at his campaign website

Conservative Party of Canada MPs
Members of the House of Commons of Canada from Ontario
People from Orillia
Living people
1957 births
Businesspeople in tourism
21st-century Canadian politicians
Ontario municipal councillors